Islamic revival (lit., "regeneration, renewal"; also  , "Islamic awakening") refers to a revival of the Islamic religion. The revivers are known in Islam as mujaddids.

Within the Islamic tradition, tajdid has been an important religious concept, which has manifested itself throughout Islamic history in periodic calls for a renewed commitment to the fundamental principles of Islam and reconstruction of society in accordance with the Quran and the traditions of the Islamic prophet Muhammad (hadith). The concept of tajdid has played a prominent role in contemporary Islamic revival.

In academic literature, "Islamic revival" is an umbrella term encompassing "a wide variety of movements, some intolerant and exclusivist, some pluralistic; some favorable to science, some anti-scientific; some primarily devotional, and some primarily political; some democratic, some authoritarian; some pacific, some violent".

After the late 1970s, when the Iranian Revolution erupted, a worldwide Islamic revival emerged in response to the success of the revolution, owing in large part to the failure of secular Arab nationalist movement in the aftermath of the Six-Day War and popular disappointment with secular nation states in the Middle East and Westernized ruling elites, which had dominated the Muslim world during the preceding decades, and which were increasingly seen as authoritarian, ineffective and lacking cultural authenticity. Further motivation for the revival included the Lebanese Civil War, which began in 1975 and resulted in a level of sectarianism between Muslims and Christians previously unseen in many Middle Eastern countries. Another motivation was the newfound wealth and discovered political leverage brought to much of the Muslim world in the aftermath of the 1973 oil crisis and also the Grand Mosque seizure which occurred in late 1979 amidst the revival; both of these events encouraged the rise of the phenomenon of "Petro-Islam" in Saudi Arabia during the mid-to-late 1970s in an effort by the Saudi monarchy to counterbalance the consolidation of the Iranian Revolution, exporting neo-Wahhabi ideologies to many mosques worldwide. As such, it has been argued that with both of the Islamic superpowers in the Middle East (Iran and Saudi Arabia) espousing Islamist ideologies by the end of the 1970s, and the isolation of the traditionally secularist Egypt during the period from being the most influential Arab country as a result of the Camp David Accords- resulting in Saudi Arabia's newfound dominance over Arab countries – the Islamic revival became especially potent amongst Muslims worldwide. With Lebanon, traditionally a source of secular Arab culture, fractured between Muslim and Christian, exposing the failures of its secular confessionalist political system, there was a general idea amongst many Muslims by the late 1970s that secularism had failed in the Middle East to deliver the demands of the masses. In Egypt, the revival was also motivated by the migration of many Egyptians during the 1980s to the Gulf countries in search of work; when they returned, returning especially in the aftermath of the Gulf War in Kuwait, they brought the neo-Wahhabist ideologies and more conservative customs of the Gulf back with them. 

Religiously, the revival was motivated by a desire to "restore Islam to ascendancy in a world that has turned away from God".  This revival has been accompanied by growth of various reformist-political movements inspired by Islam (also called Islamist), and by "re-Islamisation" of society from above and below, with manifestations ranging from sharia-based legal reforms to greater piety and growing adoption of Islamic culture (such as increased attendance at Hajj) among the Muslim public. An especially obvious sign of the re-Islamisation of many Muslims was the rise of the hijab in the public space, when in previous decades it had largely been abandoned in some Middle Eastern countries, as well as the adoption of the previously-unknown niqab by women outside of Gulf countries. Among immigrants in non-Muslim countries, it includes a feeling of a "growing universalistic Islamic identity" or transnational Islam, brought on by easier communications, media and travel. The revival has also been accompanied by an increased influence of fundamentalist preachers and terrorist attacks carried out by some radical Islamist groups on a global scale.

The revival, which erupted during the end of the 1970s and continued throughout the 1980s, has gradually fizzled out in many countries, including Saudi Arabia and Sudan, and has come to be abandoned by many younger and disillusioned people in more Islamist societies such as Iran, Tunisia, and Turkey - placing more younger people in these countries increasingly at odds with their government, with whom they associate the Islamic revival with the political authoritarianism of these countries. However it has remained fairly strong in other countries, particularly Syria, Iraq, Afghanistan and in the Sahel, as a result of the Arab Spring uprisings in 2011.

Preachers and scholars who have been described as revivalists (mujaddids) or mujaddideen, by differing sects and groups, in the history of Islam include Ahmad ibn Hanbal, Ibn Taymiyyah, Shah Waliullah Dehlawi, Ahmad Sirhindi, Ashraf Ali Thanwi, Muhammad ibn Abd al-Wahhab, and Muhammad Ahmad. In the 20th century, figures such as Sayyid Rashid Rida, Hassan al-Banna, Sayyid Qutb, Abul A'la Maududi, Malcolm X, and Ruhollah Khomeini, have been described as such, and academics often use the terms "Islamist" and "Islamic revivalist" interchangeably. Contemporary revivalist currents include Jihadism, which seeks to intellectually and militarily counter socially regressive post colonial rhetoric and influences; neo-Sufism, which cultivates Muslim spirituality; and classical fundamentalism, which stresses obedience to Sharia (Islamic law) and ritual observance.

Earlier history of revivalism

The concept of Islamic revival is based on a sahih hadith (a saying attributed to the Islamic prophet Muhammad), recorded by Abu Dawood, narrated by Abu Hurairah, who reported that Prophet Muhammad said:

Within the Islamic tradition, tajdid (lit., regeneration, renewal) has been an important religious concept. Early on into the Islamic era, Muslims realized that they have not succeeded in creating and maintaining a society that truly followed the principles of their religion. As a result, Islamic history has seen periodic calls for a renewed commitment to the fundamental principles of Islam and reconstruction of society in accordance with the Quran and the traditions of the Islamic prophet Muhammad (hadith). These efforts often drew inspiration from the hadith in which Muhammad states: "God will send to His community at the head of each century those who will renew its faith for it". Throughout Islamic history, Muslims looked to reforming religious leaders to fulfil the role of a mujaddid (lit., renovator). Although there is disagreement over which individuals might actually be identified as such, Muslims agree that mujaddids have been an important force in the history of Islamic societies.

The modern movement of Islamic revival has been compared with earlier efforts of a similar nature: The "oscillat[ion] between periods of strict religious observance and others of devotional laxity" in Islamic history was striking enough for "the Muslim historian, Ibn Khaldun to ponder its causes 600 years ago, and speculate that it could be "attributed ... to features of ecology and social organization peculiar to the Middle East", namely the tension between the easy living in the towns and the austere life in the desert.

Some of the more famous revivalists and revival movements include the Almoravid and Almohad dynasties in Maghreb and Spain (1042–1269), Indian Naqshbandi revivalist Ahmad Sirhindi (~1564–1624), the Indian Ahl-i Hadith movement of the 19th century, preachers Ibn Taymiyyah (1263–1328), Shah Waliullah Dehlawi (1702–1762), and Muhammad ibn Abd al-Wahhab (d. 1792).

In the late 19th century, Jamal al-Din al-Afghani, "one of the most influential Muslim reformers" of the era, traveled the Muslim world, advocating for Islamic modernism and pan-Islamism. His sometime acolyte Muhammad Abduh has been called "the most influential figure" of Modernist Salafism.

Muhammad Rashid Rida, his protege Hassan al-Banna would establish the Ikhwan al-Muslimeen in 1928, the first mass Islamist organization. Despite him being influenced by Rida and his drawing of ideas primarily from Islamic sources, Al-Banna nevertheless was willing to engage with modern European concepts like nationalism, constitutionalism, etc.

In South Asia, Islamic revivalist intellectuals and statesmen like Syed Ahmad Khan, Muhammad Iqbal, Muhammad Ali Jinnah promoted the Two-Nation Theory and the Muslim League established the world's first modern Islamic republic, Pakistan. Abul Ala Maududi was the later leader of this movement who established Jamaat-e-Islami in South Asia. Today it is one of the most influential Islamic parties in the Indian sub-continent, spanning three countries (Pakistan, India, and Bangladesh), although the different national parties have no organisational link between them. Muhammed Ilyas Kandhlawi was an Indian Islamic scholar who founded the widely influential Tablighi Jamaat Islamic revivalist movement, in 1925. It is now a worldwide movement with over 50 million active followers, it is a non-political movement which focuses on increasing the Muslims' faith and for them to return back to the sunnah way of life. 

Whether or not the contemporary revival is part of an historical cycle, the uniqueness of the close association of the Muslim community with its religion has been noted by scholar Michael Cook who observed that "of all the major cultural domains" the Muslim world "seems to have been the least penetrated by irreligion". In the last few decades ending in 2000, rather than scientific knowledge and secularism edging aside religion, Islamic fundamentalism has "increasingly represented the cutting edge" of Muslim culture.

Contemporary revivalism

Causes 

A global wave of Islamic revivalism emerged starting from the end of 1970s owing in large part to popular disappointment with the secular nation states and Westernized ruling elites, which had dominated the Muslim world during the preceding decades, and which were increasingly seen as authoritarian, ineffective and lacking cultural authenticity. It was also a reaction against Western influences such as individualism, consumerism, commodification of women, and sexual liberty, which were seen as subverting Islamic values and identities. Among the political factors was also the ideological vacuum that emerged after the decline of socialist system and related weakening of the liberal (Western) ideology. 

Economic and demographic factors, such as lagging economic development, a rise in income inequality and a decline in social mobility, the rise of an educated youth with expectation of higher upward mobility, and urbanization in the Muslim world also played a major part.  In general, the gap between higher expectations and reality among many in the Muslim world was an important factor.  Gulf oil money was also a huge factor, in a phenomenon known as Petro-Islam.

The above reasons are generally agreed to be the ultimate causes of the Islamic revival.  There were also specific political events which heralded the revival.  Major historical turning points in the Islamic revival include, in chronological order:

 The Arab defeat in the 1967 Six-Day War helped to convince many Muslims that pan-Arabism failed to deliver on its promises. According to a common assessment offered at the time, "the Jews had deserved victory by being truer to their religion than the Arabs had been to theirs". After a period of introspection and rise of religious discourse, the Yom Kippur War of 1973 was fought in the name of Islam rather than pan-Arabism and the greater success of Arab armies was seen to validate the change.
 The energy crisis of the 1970s, which led to the formation of the Organization of Petroleum Exporting Countries (OPEC) and the quadrupling of global oil prices. At first, this led to an expectation that the oil wealth would lead to a long-awaited resurgence of the Islamic civilization, and when this failed to materialize, the mounting frustration with secular regimes made the public more receptive to religious fundamentalism. Scholar Gilles Kepel, agrees that the tripling in the price of oil in the mid-1970s and the progressive takeover of Saudi Aramco in the 1974–1980 period, provided the source of much influence of Wahhabism in the Islamic World, in the aforementioned phenomenon of Petro-Islam.
 The opening of the first Islamic bank in Dubai.
 The rise of the Mujahideen in Afghanistan in the late 1970s.  The Mujahideen were a major beneficiary of Petro-Islam, and would ultimately lead to the rise of Al-Qaeda.
 Zia-ul-Haq introduces Islamic legal system in Pakistan.
 The return of Ayatollah Khomeini to Iran in 1979 and his establishment of an Islamic republic.
 The Grand Mosque Seizure of 1979.
 The establishment of many Islamic banks in Turkey in the mid 1980s and the government recognition of these banks.

Manifestations 
The term "Islamic revival" encompasses "a wide variety of movements, some intolerant and exclusivist, some pluralistic; some favorable to science, some anti-scientific; some primarily devotional, and some primarily political; some democratic, some authoritarian; some pacific, some violent".

The revival has been manifested in greater piety and a growing adoption of Islamic culture among ordinary Muslims. In the 1970s and 80s there were more veiled women in the streets. One striking example of it is the increase in attendance at the Hajj, the annual pilgrimage to Mecca, which grew from 90,000 in 1926 to 2 million in 1979.

Among revivalist currents, neo-fundamentalism predominates, stressing obedience to Islamic law and ritual observance. There have also been Islamic liberal revivalists attempting to reconcile Islamic beliefs with contemporary values and neo-Sufism cultivates Muslim spirituality; Many revivalist movements have a community-building orientation, focusing on collective worship, education, charity or simple sociability. Many local movements are linked up with national or transnational organizations which sponsor charitable, educational and missionary activities.

A number of revivalist movements have called for implementation of sharia. The practical implications of this call are often obscure, since historically Islamic law has varied according to time and place, but as an ideological slogan it serves "to rally support for the creation of a utopian, divinely governed Islamic state and society".

According to scholar Olivier Roy, The call to fundamentalism, centered on the sharia: this call is as old as Islam itself and yet still new because it has never been fulfilled, It is a tendency that is forever setting the reformer, the censor, and tribunal against the corruption of the times and of sovereigns, against foreign influence, political opportunism, moral laxity, and the forgetting of sacred texts.

Contemporary Islamic revival includes a feeling of a "growing universalistic Islamic identity" as often shared by Muslim immigrants and their children who live in non-Muslim countries. According to Ira Lapidus,

The increased integration of world societies as a result of enhanced communications, media, travel, and migration makes meaningful the concept of a single Islam practiced everywhere in similar ways, and an Islam which transcends national and ethnic customs.

But not necessarily transnational political or social organisations:

Global Muslim identity does not necessarily or even usually imply organised group action. Even though Muslims recognise a global affiliation, the real heart of Muslim religious life remains outside politics – in local associations for worship, discussion, mutual aid, education, charity, and other communal activities.

Scholarship and fiqh
Islamic revivalist leaders have been "activists first, and scholars only secondarily", emphasizing practical issues of Islamic law and impatience with theory. According to Daniel W. Brown, two "broad features" define the revivalist approach to Islamic authorities: distrust of Islamic scholarship along with "vehement rejection" of taqlid (accepting a scholar's decision without investigating it); and at the same time a strong commitment to the Quran and Sunnah.

Political aspects

Politically, Islamic resurgence runs the gamut from Islamist regimes in Iran, Sudan, and Taliban Afghanistan. Other regimes, such as countries in the Persian Gulf region, and the secular countries of Iraq, Egypt, Libya, and Pakistan, while not a product of the resurgence, have made some concessions to its growing popularity.

In reaction to Islamist opposition during the 1980s, even avowedly secular Muslim states "endeavoured to promote a brand of conservative Islam and to organise an `official Islam`". Official radio stations and journals opened up to fundamentalist preaching.

In 1971, the constitution of Egypt was made to specify (in article 2) that the sharia was "the main source of legislation". In 1991, the Egyptian Security Court condemned the writer Ala'a Hamid to eight years in prison for blasphemy. By the mid 1990s, the official Islamic journal in Egypt – Al-Liwa al-Islami – had a higher circulation than Al-Ahram. The number of "teaching institutes dependent" on Al-Azhar University in Egypt increased "from 1985 in 1986–7 to 4314 in 1995–6".

In Pakistan, a bill to make sharia the exclusive source of law of the state was introduced after General Zia's coup in 1977, and finally passed in 1993 under Nawaz Sharif's government. The number of registered madrassas rose from 137 in 1947 to 3906 in 1995.

In Sudan, the sharia penal code was proclaimed in 1983. South Yemen (formerly the People's Democratic Republic of Yemen) made polygamy legal with a new Family Code in 1992.

In Algeria, the leftist secularist FLN government made Friday an official holy day in 1976. The family law of 1984 "re-introduced some sharia elements" such as Quranic dissymmetry between men and women, and the official policy of Arabisation led to a de facto Islamisation of education.

In secular Turkey, religious teaching in schools was made compulsory in 1983. Religious graduates of İmam Hatip secondary schools were given right of access to the universities and allowed to apply for civil service positions, introducing it to religious-minded people.

Even the Marxist government of Afghanistan, before it was overthrown, introduced religious programs on television in 1986, and declared Islam to be the state religion in 1987.

In Morocco, at the end of the 1990s, more doctorates were written in religious sciences than in social sciences and literature. In Saudi Arabia, the absolute majority of doctorates were in religious sciences.

In Syria, despite the rule of the Arab nationalist Arab Socialist Ba'ath Party,

In many Muslim countries, there has been a growth of networks of religious schools. "Graduates holding a degree in religious science are now entering the labour market and tend, of course, to advocate the Islamization of education and law in order to improve their job prospects."

In Iraq, Ayatollah Muhammad Baqir al-Sadr criticized Marxism and presented early ideas of an Islamic alternative to socialism and capitalism. Perhaps his most important work was Iqtisaduna (Our Economics), considered an important work of Islamic economics.

Criticism

One observation made of Islamization is that increased piety and adoption of Sharia has "in no way changed the rules of the political or economic game", by leading to greater virtue. "Ethnic and tribal segmentation, political maneuvering, personal rivalries" have not diminished, nor has corruption in politics and economics based on speculation.

See also

 International propagation of Salafism and Wahhabism
 Petro-Islam
 Ahmadiyya
 Contemporary Islamic philosophy
 Islamistan
 Islamization of knowledge
 Islam and modernity

Notes

Sources

Further reading
 Rahnema, Ali ; Pioneers of Islamic Revival (Studies in Islamic Society); London: Zed Books, 1994
 Lapidus, Ira Marvin, A History of Islamic Societies, Cambridge University Press; 2 edition (August 26, 2002)
 Roy, Olivier; Globalized Islam: The Search for a New Ummah (CERI Series in Comparative Politics and International Studies), 1994

External links
 The Islamic revival in Egypt
 Islamic revival in Jordan
 Africa and Islamic Revival: Historical and Contemporary Perspectives

Islamism
Political neologisms